Dela Ahiawor is a Ghanaian sports journalist and editor-at-large at Sports24ghana.com. He is an official at OSJU.

References

Ghanaian sports journalists
Living people
Year of birth missing (living people)